47th Street Theatre is an Off Broadway theatre venue at 304 West 47th Street in New York City's Hell's Kitchen neighborhood. Built as Fire Engine Company No. 54 in 1888, it was designed by Napoleon LeBrun & Sons for the New York City Fire Department. It is a New York City designated landmark.

By the early 1970s, the firehouse had been abandoned, and Miriam Colon revived the building as a home for the Puerto Rican Traveling Theater. In 2007, the theater began showing productions of the Forbidden Broadway series of shows.  In June 2017, Spamilton, a parody of the musical Hamilton moved to the theatre from the Triad Theatre.

References

External links 

Theatres in Manhattan
Off-Broadway theaters
New York City Designated Landmarks in Manhattan
Hell's Kitchen, Manhattan
Fire stations in New York City